Miersch is a surname of:

 Ekkehard Miersch (born 1936), German swimmer
 Konrad Miersch (1907–1942), German modern pentathlete
 Matthias Miersch (born 1968), German lawyer and politician
 Paul Miersch (1868–1956), German-born American composer

Surnames of German origin